The Paint Rock Canyon Archeological Landscape District is a  area of Native American archeological sites on the west side of the Bighorn Mountains of Wyoming. The area contains sites ranging from the late Paleoindian period of about 9000 years before present to late Prehistoric times. The sites include open campsites and rock shelters. The district was added to the National Register of Historic Places on July 12, 1990.

References

External links
 Paint Rock Canyon Archeological Landscape District at the Wyoming State Historic Preservation Office

National Register of Historic Places in Big Horn County, Wyoming
Archaeological sites on the National Register of Historic Places in Wyoming